Channo Kamli Yaar Di (2016) is a Punjabi film directed by Pankaj Batra and starring Neeru Bajwa and Binnu Dhillon with a released date of February 19, 2016. Channo (Neeru Bajwa) is an emotional journey of a pregnant Punjabi girl who goes to Canada to find her missing husband, Jeet. Taji (Binnu Dhillon) goes along with her.

Plot 
Channo (Neeru Bajwa) is an emotional journey of a pregnant Punjabi girl who goes to Canada to find her missing husband, Jeet. Taji (Binnu Dhillon) goes along with her. However, Taji is in love with Channo since they have met but was not able to express his feelings. They go through some obstacles in Canada. However, towards the end of the film, Taji finally expresses his feelings toward Channo. Channo tells him that she loves him as a "friend". At the end, they do successfully find Jeet after going through a lot of difficulties. Even though Taji helps Channo. Taji does not marry Channo as Channo is still in love with Jeet. They, However still remain good friends.

Cast 
Neeru Bajwa as Chanpreet Kaur - Channo
Binnu Dhillon as Taaji
Karamjit Anmol as Jailly
Rana Ranbir as Taaji's friend
 Anita Devgan as Taaji's mother
 Baninderjit Singh
 Jassi Gill as Jeet Sandhu (Special Appearance)

Track listing

Reception
Jasmine Singh from The Tribune claimed that it was a good story with generous seasoning of mystery, with crisp direction and fabulous acting by Binnu and Neeru Bajwa it now bags three and a half stars!  Another site punjabvision.com praised CHANNO, declaring it "milestone in punjabi cinema".

References

External links 
 

2016 films
Punjabi-language Indian films
2010s Punjabi-language films
Films directed by Pankaj Batra
Films scored by Jatinder Shah